is a former Japanese football player. He is the twin brother of Keishi Otani.

Playing career
Otani was born in Isesaki on April 17, 1983. After graduating from high school, he joined J1 League club Kashima Antlers in 2002. Although he debuted in May 2004, he could only play 2 matches until 2004. In 2005, he moved to Albirex Niigata. However he could not play at all in the match. In June 2006, he moved to Regional Leagues club Japan Soccer College. In October 2008, he moved to Japan Football League club Arte Takasaki. He played many matches as regular midfielder until 2009. He retired end of 2009 season.

Club statistics

References

External links

1983 births
Living people
Association football people from Gunma Prefecture
Japanese footballers
J1 League players
Japan Football League players
Kashima Antlers players
Albirex Niigata players
Japan Soccer College players
Arte Takasaki players
Twin sportspeople
Japanese twins
Association football midfielders